Samarin District is in Ardabil County, Ardabil province, Iran. At the 2006 census, its population was 10,730 in 2,291 households, at which time it constituted the predecessor region of Gharbi Rural District within the Central District. The following census in 2011 counted 9,161 people in 2,314 households. At the latest census in 2016, the district had 8,471 inhabitants living in 2,452 households.

References 

Ardabil County

Districts of Ardabil Province

Populated places in Ardabil Province

Populated places in Ardabil County

fa:بخش ثمرین